is a passenger railway station located in the city of Fujimi, Saitama, Japan, operated by the private railway operator Tōbu Railway.

Lines
Located between Yanasegawa and Tsuruse stations, it is 20.6 km from the Ikebukuro terminus. Only Semi express and Local services stop at this station.

Station layout
The station consists of a single island platform serving two tracks, with an elevated station building located above the platform.

Platforms

History

The station opened on 21 October 1977.

Through-running to and from  via the Tokyo Metro Fukutoshin Line commenced on 14 June 2008.

From 17 March 2012, station numbering was introduced on the Tobu Tojo Line, with Mizuhodai Station becoming "TJ-16".

Passenger statistics
In fiscal 2019, the station was used by an average of 41,146 passengers daily.

See also
 List of railway stations in Japan

References

External links

  

Tobu Tojo Main Line
Stations of Tobu Railway
Railway stations in Saitama Prefecture
Railway stations in Japan opened in 1977
Fujimi, Saitama